Kropp-Stapelholm is an Amt ("collective municipality") in the district of Schleswig-Flensburg, in Schleswig-Holstein, Germany. Its seat is in Kropp. It was formed on 1 January 2008 from the former Ämter Kropp and Stapelholm.

Subdivision
The Amt Kropp-Stapelholm consists of the following municipalities:

Alt Bennebek
Bergenhusen 
Börm 
Dörpstedt 
Erfde 
Groß Rheide 
Klein Bennebek 
Klein Rheide 
Kropp
Meggerdorf 
Stapel
Tetenhusen 
Tielen
Wohlde

References 

Ämter in Schleswig-Holstein